Alfred Burgemeister
Katja Burgemeister
Ludwig Burgemeister